Willow Consolidated High School, also known as Norway Junior High School and Norway Middle School, is a historic high school building located at Norway, Orangeburg County, South Carolina. It was built in 1926, and is a one-story, "T" shaped brick veneer building with an auditorium located at the rear.  It has a gable-on-hip roof with projecting cross gables at the center and ends of the building's façade. Also on the property is a separate frame agriculture building (1940). The school closed in the late 1980s.

It was added to the National Register of Historic Places in 2006.

References

High schools in South Carolina
School buildings on the National Register of Historic Places in South Carolina
School buildings completed in 1926
Buildings and structures in Orangeburg County, South Carolina
National Register of Historic Places in Orangeburg County, South Carolina
1926 establishments in South Carolina